Advanced Institute for Research on Religion and Culture (ARRC) is a federated faculty established in 2016, which comprises four institutions, namely, 
 Andhra Christian Theological College, 
 Calvin Institute of Theology, 
 Henry Martyn Institute and,
 Mennonite Brethren Centenary Bible College
- all based in the twin cities of Hyderabad and Secunderabad offering post graduate level Master of Theology courses with specializations in Sacred scripture and Religion.

The ARRC is affiliated to the nation's first University, the Senate of Serampore College (University) {a University under Section 2 (f) of the University Grants Commission Act, 1956}with degree-granting authority validated by a Danish charter and ratified by the Government of West Bengal.

History

Theological colleges
The first theological colleges established in Hyderabad and Secunderabad is the Mennonite Brethren Centenary Bible College founded in 1920 in Shamshabad locality.  The rest of the seminaries were founded elsewhere and relocated later to the twin cities.  St. John's Regional Seminary was founded in 1926 and relocated in 1965.  Though the Andhra Christian Theological College was founded in 1964 in Rajahmundry, it moved to Secunderabad only in 1973.  The Calvin Institute of Theology is a recent addition which was established in 2009 and relocated later.  As for the Henry Martyn Institute, it was only an institution offering post graduate diploma courses under its seal, which also relocated to Hyderabad in 1972.

Scholars
Of these theological colleges, the St. John's Regional Seminary and the Andhra Christian Theological College had faculty with highest academic qualifications having been educated at famed portals of learning in Europe, North America, Africa and the Indian subcontinent in Universities of Edinburgh, Cambridge, Hamburg, Cape Town, Chicago, Serampore, Papal Seminary, Wisconsin, Lancaster, McCormick, Syracuse, Eastern, Hartford, Duke, Union, PIB Rome, Gregorian, Urban and other distinguished schools of theological education.

Efforts to initiate postgraduate level courses
However, though the faculty were qualified enough, the institutions where they taught were eligible to only offer graduate level courses.  Efforts were made by successive faculty of the Andhra Christian Theological College beginning during the tenure of the New Testament Scholar, The Rev. S. Joseph coinciding with the Silver Jubilee Celebrations of the College in 1989 to start postgraduate level courses.  After nearly a decade and half, efforts were renewed by the Old Testament Scholar Trio, beginning with The Rev. N. V. Luther Paul, D. Th. (Serampore) (2006-2010) followed by The Rev. Ch. Vasantha Rao, Dr. Theol. (Hamburg) (2010-2014) and The Rev. T. Matthews Emmanuel, D. Th. (Serampore) (2014-2017).

Creation of special purpose entity
Meanwhile, with the addition of Calvin Institute of Theology that was established in 2009, efforts fructified, but this time in confederation with other institutions, the postgraduate courses were finally initiated with the creation of the Special-purpose entity consisting of Andhra Christian Theological College, the Henry Martyn Institute, and the Calvin Institute of Theology during the tenures of The Rev. T. Matthews Emmanuel, D. Th. (Serampore), The Rev. Packiam T. Samuel, Ph. D., (Oxford Brookes) and The Rev. Gopalswamy Jacob, Ph. D., (Apeldoorn) respectively, together forming the Advanced Institute for Research on Religion and Culture (ARRC) in 2016 for which the Senate of Serampore College (University) granted affiliation beginning with the academic year 2016.

Academics
As per the affiliation norms of the Senate of Serampore College (University), the federated faculty is authorized to offer courses in Master of Theology in three disciplines, namely, the Old Testament, the New Testament and Religions (Hinduism and Islam).

Faculty
The faculty in the three specializations offered by the ARRC include,

References

Christian seminaries and theological colleges in India
Universities and colleges in Hyderabad, India
Educational institutions established in 2016
Reformed church seminaries and theological colleges
Universities and colleges affiliated with the Church of South India
2016 establishments in Telangana
Seminaries and theological colleges affiliated to the Senate of Serampore College (University)